Nate Maness (born June 27, 1991), is an American mixed martial artist who competes in the Bantamweight division of the Ultimate Fighting Championship.

Mixed martial arts career

Early career
Maness made his amateur debut in 2013, winning four bouts before turning professional in the same year.

Outside the UFC, Nathan Maness collected three belts at three different weight classes, ranging from 135 through 155 lbs. in 12 professional fights, “Mayhem” won six of them via stoppage, four in the very first frame. After he won the bantamweight championship of the Quebec-based TKO promotion in 2018, his sole loss came when he dropped the belt to former UFC competitor Taylor Lapilus in May 2019 but came back with a first-round stoppage win in February in his next bout.

Ultimate Fighting Championship
Maness was scheduled to face Ray Borg on August 1, 2020, at UFC Fight Night: Brunson vs. Shahbazyan. However, Borg was removed from the fight on the day of the event's weigh-in for undisclosed reasons. Maness went on to face Johnny Muñoz Jr. in a featherweight bout. He won the close bout via unanimous decision. 5 out of 15 media scores gave it to Muñoz, 6 out of 10 gave it to Maness, and 4 scored it a draw.

Maness faced Luke Sanders on November 28, 2020, at UFC on ESPN: Blaydes vs. Lewis. He won the fight via second round submission. He earned a Performance of the Night bonus for the win.

Maness was scheduled to face Tony Gravely at UFC on ESPN: Whittaker vs. Gastelum on April 17, 2021. However, Maness was removed from the bout for undisclosed reasons.

The bout with Gravely was rescheduled for September 18, 2021 at UFC Fight Night: Smith vs. Spann. Maness won the fight via technical knockout in round two after being knocked down and almost finished in the first round. This win earned him the Performance of the Night award.

Maness faced Umar Nurmagomedov on June 25, 2022, at UFC on ESPN 38. He lost the fight via unanimous decision.

Maness faced Tagir Ulanbekov on November 5, 2022 at UFC Fight Night 214. He lost the fight via a guillotine choke in the first round.

Maness is scheduled to face Zhalgas Zhumagulov on May 6, 2023 at UFC 288.

Championships and accomplishments

Mixed martial arts
Ultimate Fighting Championship
Performance of the Night (Two time) 
Hard Rock MMA
HR MMA Featherweight Championship (One time; former)
TKO Major League MMA
TKO Bantamweight Championship (One time; former)
Warrior FC
Warrior FC Lightweight Championship (One time; former)
Bluegrass Brawl
BB Bantamweight Championship (One time; former)

Mixed martial arts record

|-
|Loss
|align=center|14–3
|Tagir Ulanbekov
|Submission (guillotine choke)
|UFC Fight Night: Rodriguez vs. Lemos
|
|align=center|1
|align=center|2:11
|Las Vegas, Nevada, United States
|
|-
|Loss
|align=center|14–2
|Umar Nurmagomedov
|Decision (unanimous)
|UFC on ESPN: Tsarukyan vs. Gamrot
|
|align=center|3
|align=center|5:00
|Las Vegas, Nevada, United States
|
|-
|Win
|align=center|14–1
|Tony Gravely
|TKO (punches)
|UFC Fight Night: Smith vs. Spann
|
|align=center|2
|align=center|2:10
|Las Vegas, Nevada, United States
|
|-
| Win
| align=center|13–1
|Luke Sanders
|Submission (rear-naked choke)
|UFC on ESPN: Smith vs. Clark
|
|align=center|2
|align=center|2:29
|Las Vegas, Nevada, United States
|
|-
|Win
|align=center| 12–1
|Johnny Muñoz Jr.
|Decision (unanimous)
|UFC Fight Night: Brunson vs. Shahbazyan
|
|align=center|3
|align=center|5:00
|Las Vegas, Nevada, United States
|
|-
| Win
| align=center| 11–1
|Kellen VanCamp
| KO (punches)
| HR MMA 114
| 
| align=center| 1
| align=center| 1:39
| Shepherdsville, Kentucky, United States
|
|-
| Loss
| align=center|10–1
| Taylor Lapilus
|KO (kick to the body)
|TKO 48: Sousa vs Gane 
|
|align=center|3
|align=center|1:22
|Gatineau, Quebec, Canada
|
|-
| Win
| align=center|10–0
| Jesse Arnett
| TKO (punches)
|TKO 44
|
| align=center|2
| align=center|2:53
|Québec City, Québec, Canada
|
|-
| Win
| align=center|9–0
| Caio Machado
|Decision (unanimous)
|TKO 42: Nogueira vs. Laramie
|
|align=center|3
|align=center|5:00
|Laval, Québec, Canada
|
|-
| Win
| align=center| 8–0
| Marc McDonald
| Submission (brabo choke)
| Premier MMA Championship 3
| 
| align=center| 2
| align=center| 4:10
| Covington, Kentucky, United States
|
|-
| Win
| align=center| 7–0
| Brandon Bell
|Decision (unanimous)
|Warrior FC: Caged Chaos
|
|align=center|3
|align=center|5:00
|Harlan, Kentucky, United States
|
|-
| Win
| align=center| 6–0
|Michael Ricketts
|TKO (punches)
|Colosseum Combat 33
|
|align=center|1
|align=center|3:42
|Kokomo, Indiana, United States
|
|-
| Win
| align=center|5–0
|Kodey Gulley
|Decision (unanimous)
|Fight Lab 45
|
|align=center|3
|align=center|5:00
|Charlotte, North Carolina, United States
|
|-
| Win
| align=center| 4–0
| Isaiah Ferguson
|Decision (split)
|Hardrock MMA 69
|
|align=center|3
|align=center|5:00
|Shepherdsville, Kentucky, United States
|
|-
| Win
| align=center|3–0
| Brandon Sandefur
|TKO (punches)
| Hardrock MMA 60
|
| align=center|1
| align=center|3:13
|Shepherdsville, Kentucky, United States
|
|-
| Win
| align=center|2–0
| Jason Blackford
| Submission (rear-naked choke)
|Hardrock MMA 58
|
| align=center|1
| align=center|2:55
|Bowling Green, Kentucky, United States
|
|-
| Win
| align=center|1–0
| Jeremy Pender
| Decision (unanimous)
|Bluegrass Brawl 8
|
|align=center|3
|align=center|5:00
|Lexington, Kentucky, United States
|

See also 
 List of current UFC fighters
 List of male mixed martial artists

References

External links 
  
 

1991 births
Living people
American male mixed martial artists
Bantamweight mixed martial artists
Mixed martial artists utilizing Brazilian jiu-jitsu
Ultimate Fighting Championship male fighters
American practitioners of Brazilian jiu-jitsu